Bořitov is a municipality and village in Blansko District in the South Moravian Region of the Czech Republic. It has about 1,300 inhabitants.

Notable people
Michaela Hrubá (born 1998), athlete

References

Villages in Blansko District